Poul Mortensen (born 19 August 1937) is a Danish rower. He competed in the men's double sculls event at the 1960 Summer Olympics.

References

External links
 

1937 births
Living people
Danish male rowers
Olympic rowers of Denmark
Rowers at the 1960 Summer Olympics
People from Svendborg
Sportspeople from the Region of Southern Denmark